The prix Interallié (Interallié Prize), also known simply as l'Interallié,  is an annual French literary award, awarded for a novel written by a journalist.

History 
The prize was started on 3 December 1930 by about thirty or so journalists who were having lunch at the cercle de l'Union interallié (Interallied Union Club), who were waiting for the winner of the prix Femina to be announced.

The jury is composed of ten journalists, and the previous year's winner.  The prize is generally awarded sometime in early November, after the prix Goncourt.  Deliberations now take place at the Parisian restaurant, Lasserre.  Although winning the Interallié usually helps a novel's sales, the prix Interallié is purely honorific, and no prize money is awarded.

Winners

References

External links 
List of previous Interallié winners (in French)

Interallié
Awards established in 1930
1930 establishments in France